The following elections occurred in 1964.

Africa
 1964 Cameroonian parliamentary election
 1964 Central African Republic parliamentary election
 1964 Central African Republic presidential election
 1964 Dahomeyan general election
 1964 Gabonese legislative election
 1964 Malian parliamentary election
 1964 Nigerian parliamentary election
 1964 Northern Rhodesian general election
 1964 Nyasaland general election
 Somali parliamentary election, 1964
 Swazi parliamentary election, 1964

Asia
 1964 Iranian legislative election
 1964 Malaysian general election
 1964 Papua New Guinea general election

Australia
 1964 Australian Senate election
 1964 Tasmanian state election
 1964 Victorian state election

Europe
 1964 Danish parliamentary election
 1964 Gibraltar general election
 Greek legislative election, 1964
 Luxembourgian legislative election, 1964
 1964 Swedish general election

France
 1964 French cantonal elections

United Kingdom
 1964 United Kingdom general election
 1964 Greater London Council election
 List of MPs elected in the 1964 United Kingdom general election
 1964 Liverpool Scotland by-election
 1964 London local elections
 1964 Rutherglen by-election

United Kingdom local
 1964 Lambeth Council election
 1964 Lewisham Council election
 1964 Newham Council election
 1964 Southwark Council election

North America

Canada
 1964 Edmonton municipal election
 1964 Northwest Territories general election
 1964 Ottawa municipal election
 1964 Saskatchewan general election
 1964 Toronto municipal election
 1964 Yukon general election

Caribbean
 1964 Haitian constitutional referendum

Mexico
 1964 Mexican general election

United States
 1964 United States presidential election
 1964 United States Senate elections
 1964 United States House of Representatives elections
 United States House of Representatives elections in California, 1964
 1964 Massachusetts gubernatorial election
 1964 New York state election

United States Senate
 1964 United States Senate elections
 United States Senate election in Massachusetts, 1964
 United States Senate election in North Dakota, 1964

Oceania

Australia
 1964 Australian Senate election
 1964 Tasmanian state election
 1964 Victorian state election

South America
 1964 Chilean presidential election
 1964 Falkland Islands general election
 1964 Guatemalan Constitutional Assembly election
 1964 Panamanian general election
 1964 Salvadoran legislative election

See also

 
1964
Elections